The 1891 Maryland gubernatorial election took place on November 3, 1891.

Incumbent Democratic Governor Elihu Emory Jackson did not seek re-election.

Democratic candidate Frank Brown defeated Republican candidate William J. Vannort.

General election

Candidates
Frank Brown, Democratic, former member of the Maryland House of Delegates, former Postmaster of Baltimore
William J. Vannort, Republican, farmer
Edwin Higgins, Prohibition

Results

References

Gubernatorial
1891
Maryland